The Collins & Milazzo exhibitions were a series of art exhibitions curated by the team Tricia Collins and Richard Milazzo, mainly in New York in the mid-1980s to early 1990s. 

From 1982 to 1984 the pair founded, edited and published Effects : Magazine for New Art Theory. Drawing on their experience with the magazine, in 1984  Collins & Milazzo began working together as curators to transform the group show into a critical statement. Collins & Milazzo brought to prominence a new generation of artists in the 1980s. It was their exhibitions and writings that originally fashioned the theoretical context for a new kind of Post-conceptual art that argued simultaneously against Neo-Expressionism and Picture-Theory Art. It was through this context that the work of many of the artists associated with Neo-Conceptualism (or what the critics reductively called Simulationism and Neo Geo) was first brought together.

Selected Collins & Milazzo exhibitions
Civilization and the Landscape of Discontent. Gallery Nature Morte, New York, March 1984.
Still Life With Transaction: Former Objects, New Moral Arrangements, and the History of Surfaces. International With Monument Gallery, New York, March 28 - April 21, 1984.
Natural Genre:  From the Neutral Subject to the Hypothesis of World Objects. Florida State University Gallery & Museum, Tall., Fla., Aug. 31-Sept. 30, 1984.
Still Life With Transaction II:  Former Objects, New Moral Arrangements, and the History of Surfaces. Galerie Jurka, Amsterdam, November 1984.
The New Capital. White Columns, New York, December 4, 1984 - January 5, 1985.
Final Love. C.A.S.H./Newhouse Gallery, New York, March 15 - April 14, 1985.
Paravision. Postmasters Gallery, New York, May 3 - June 2, 1985.
Persona Non Grata. Daniel Newburg Gallery, New York, September 11 - October 5, 1985.
Cult and Decorum. Tibor De Nagy Gallery, New York, December 7, 1985 - January 4, 1986.
Time After Time (A Sculpture Show). Diane Brown Gallery, New York, March 8 - April 2, 1986.
Spiritual America. CEPA, Buffalo, May 3 - June 15, 1986.
Paravision II. Margo Leavin Gallery, Los Angeles, July 12 - August 23, 1986.
Ultrasurd. S.L. Simpson Gallery, Toronto, September 1986.
Modern Sleep. American Fine Arts Co., New York, October 17 - November 16, 1986.
The Antique Future. Massimo Audiello Gallery, New York, February 13 - March 15, 1987.
Extreme Order. Lia Rumma Gallery, Naples, May - July 1987.
The Ironic Sublime. Galerie Albrecht, Munich, June 4 - July 18, 1987.
The New Poverty. John Gibson Gallery, New York, October 10 - November 7, 1987.
Media Post Media. Scott Hanson Gallery, New York, January 6 - February 9, 1988.
Off White. Diane Brown Gallery, New York, May 24 - June 18, 1988.
Art at the End of the Social. The Rooseum, Malmö, Sweden, July - October 1988.
Hybrid Neutral: Modes of Abstraction and the Social. I.C.I. Exhibition: University Art Gallery, The University of North Texas, Denton, Texas, August 29 - September 30, 1988; J.B. Speed Art Museum, Louisville, Kentucky, November 7, 1988 - January 2, 1989; Alberta College Gallery of Art, Calgary, Alberta, Canada, February 9 - March 9, 1989; The Contemporary Arts Center, Cincinnati, Ohio, March 31 - May 6, 1989; Richard F. Brush Art Gallery, St. Lawrence University, Canton, New York, October 12 - November 15, 1989; Santa Fe Community College Art Gallery & Museum, Gainesville, Florida, February 4 - March 18, 1990; Mendel Art Gallery & Museum, Saskatoon, Saskatchewan, Canada, July 1990.
Primary Forms, Mediated Structures. Massimo Audiello Gallery, New York, September - October 1988.
The New Poverty II. Meyers/Bloom Gallery, Santa Monica, California, December 3, 1988 - January 8, 1989.
Pre-Pop Post-Appropriation. Stux Gallery, in cooperation with Leo Castelli, New York, February 3 - March 4, 1989.
Buena Vista. John Gibson Gallery, New York, October 14 - November 11, 1989.
The Last Laugh: Irony, Humor, Self-Mockery and Derision. Massimo Audiello Gallery, New York, January 6 - February 17, 1990.
The Last Decade: American Artists of the ’80s. Tony Shafrazi Gallery, New York, September 15 - October 27, 1990.
All Quiet on the Western Front? [75 Americans in Paris]. Antoine Candau, Paris, September 26 - December 31, 1990.
Who Framed Modern Art or the Quantitative Life of Roger Rabbit. Sidney Janis Gallery, New York, January 10 - February 16, 1991
Outside America: Going into the 90’s. Fay Gold Gallery, Atlanta, Georgia, March - April 1991.
A New Low. Claudio Botello Gallery, Turin, Italy, May 9 - June 15, 1991.
New Era Space. New Era Building, sponsored by Leo Castelli, New York, October 3–28, 1991.
Theoretically Yours. Regione Autonoma della Valle d’Aosta, Chiesa di San Lorenzo, Aosta, Italy, May 29 - June 28, 1992.
Who’s Afraid of Duchamp, Minimalism, and Passport Photography? Annina Nosei Gallery, New York, October 1992.

References

Visual arts exhibitions